Constance A. Howard (born 1942) is an American politician. She is a former Democratic member of the Illinois House of Representatives, representing the 34th District from 1995 to 2012. In 2008, Howard was named as one of Utne Reader magazine's “50 Visionaries Who Are Changing the World.”  She is also a convicted felon.

Originally elected from the 32nd district, her district became the 34th in 2002, following redistricting.  She resigned from office in July 2012.

Federal conviction

Federal authorities caught Howard as part of a sweeping FBI probe into Illinois grant money that began in 2010. She had helped found Let's Talk, Let's Test Foundation, a nonprofit organization that sought to educate the black community about HIV/AIDS and provide testing services.

The foundation received $1.7 million in state grant money in 2007. Its executive director, Lloyd Kelly, who also worked as one of Howard's aides, was indicted after spending some of that money on a home, football tickets and alcohol, and to pay for interns at Howard's legislative office.

She had also started a scholarship fund aimed at helping minority students learn digital technology. She hosted an annual golf outing to raise money for it. Prosecutors said she raised about $76,700 between 2003 and 2007 but gave out only $12,500. She spent about $28,000 on personal and political expenses, which she was eventually ordered to pay back as part of her plea deal. It was unclear where the rest of the money went. A contribution mailed to her for one of the golf outings led to the mail fraud charge. Howard was an Illinois House member at the time of the crime.

Confronted with the evidence, Howard waived indictment and pleaded guilty to mail fraud on July 24, 2013. She was sentenced to a term of three months in prison.

References

External links
Illinois General Assembly – Representative Constance A. Howard (D) 34th District official IL House website
Bills Committees
Project Vote Smart – Representative Constance A. 'Connie' Howard (IL) profile
Follow the Money – Constance A (Connie) Howard
2006 2004 2002 2000 1998 1996 campaign contributions
Illinois House Democrats – Constance A. 'Connie' Howard profile

1942 births
Living people
African-American state legislators in Illinois
African-American women in politics
Democratic Party members of the Illinois House of Representatives
2000 United States presidential electors
2004 United States presidential electors
2008 United States presidential electors
Women state legislators in Illinois
Illinois politicians convicted of crimes
20th-century American women politicians
20th-century American politicians
21st-century American politicians
21st-century American women politicians
20th-century African-American women
20th-century African-American politicians
21st-century African-American women
21st-century African-American politicians